Elizabeth May Brice (born 8 September 1975) is an English actress. She is known for roles such as the convicted murderer Pat Kerrigan on ITV1's Bad Girls, and Agent Johnson in Torchwood: Children of Earth.

Career
Brice was born in Redhill, Surrey. She studied English at Cambridge University. Her early acting roles included a schoolgirl witch in the 1986 adaptation of Jill Murphy's novel, The Worst Witch and a part in children's sitcom News at Twelve (1988) (for both these roles she was credited as "Lisa" Brice). She joined the cast of prison drama Bad Girls in Series 7, in 2005 as Pat Kerrigan, who is serving life in prison for the murder of her ex-boyfriend. Her character would become the final 'Top Dog' of the show.

Brice has appeared in episodes of BBC's Hustle and played the role of Medic in the film version of Resident Evil. She had a cameo in another horror film, AVP: Alien vs Predator. Her CV also includes the film sequel Fortress 2 with Christopher Lambert and the US mini-series The 10th Kingdom. Brice also appeared in the popular Channel 4 sitcom Peep Show in 2007. In the same year, she played the role of Susannah bat Jonah in Roman Mysteries, the CBBC children's drama based on the Roman Mysteries books by Caroline Lawrence, alongside Nicholas Farrell, whom she would later work alongside in Torchwood'''s Children of Earth. In 2008 she played the role of Herrena in the TV adaptation of Terry Pratchett's The Colour of Magic.

She has also starred in her former partner Charlie Brooker's zombie horror Dead Set, and appears as Government assassin Agent Johnson in Torchwood's Children of Earth, aired in July 2009. She has also starred in The Bill as anti-terrorism officer, Karen Lacy.

In April 2010 she appeared in the episode "Loves Me, Loves Me Not" of BBC serial drama Casualty, playing the part of Lyn (mother of two of the child patients). She becomes involved with Dr. Adam Trueman when he realises she is a single mother.

In the 2012 crime thriller movie Hard Boiled Sweets, Brice portrayed the role of Jenna.

In 2013, Brice played a character called Tara - the new love interest for Billy Mitchell (Perry Fenwick) - in the soap opera EastEnders. She appeared in the soap from 26–30 August. Brice's character also made a rival out of the local B&B owner, Kim Fox (Tameka Empson). She then appeared as Tina in Misfits.

In 2014, Brice voiced Licia of Lindeldt & Milibeth in Dark Souls II, and later portrayed Gainsborough in the Black Mirror'' holiday special titled "White Christmas".

Filmography

References

External links

Interview with Brice regarding her role as Pat Kerrigan on afterellen.com, 15 December 2005
Interview with Brice regarding her role as Pat Kerrigan on the official Bad Girls webpage

1975 births
English child actresses
English film actresses
English television actresses
Living people
People from Redhill, Surrey
Actresses from Surrey
Alumni of the University of Cambridge
20th-century English actresses
21st-century English actresses